Q-ships, also known as Q-boats, decoy vessels, special service ships, or mystery ships, were heavily armed merchant ships with concealed weaponry, designed to lure submarines into making surface attacks. This gave Q-ships the chance to open fire and sink them. The use of Q-ships contributed to the abandonment of cruiser rules restricting attacks on unarmed merchant ships and to the shift to unrestricted submarine warfare in the 20th century.

They were used by the British Royal Navy and the German Kaiserliche Marine during the First World War and by the Royal Navy, the Kriegsmarine, the Imperial Japanese Navy, and the United States Navy during the Second World War (1939–45).

Etymology
Short for Queenstown in Ireland, as Haulbowline Dockyard in Cork Harbour was responsible for the conversion of many mercantile steamers to armed decoy ships in World War One, although the majority appear to have been converted in larger navy yards such as Devonport.

Early uses of the concept
In the 1670s,  was specially designed to counter the attacks of Algerian corsairs or pirates in the Mediterranean by masquerading as a merchantman, hiding her armament behind false bulkheads. She was also provided with various means of changing her appearance.

During the French Revolutionary Wars, a French brig disguised as a merchantman, with hidden guns and most of her crew below decks, was beaten back by the privateer lugger Vulture out of Jersey.

First World War

In 1915, during the First Battle of the Atlantic, Britain was in desperate need of a countermeasure against the U-boats that were strangling her sea-lanes. Convoys, which had proved effective in earlier times (and would again prove effective during the Second World War), were rejected by the resource-strapped Admiralty and the independent captains. Depth charges of the time were relatively primitive, and almost the only chance of sinking a submarine was by gunfire or by ramming while on the surface. The problem was how to lure the U-boat to the surface.

A solution to this was the creation of the Q-ship, one of the most closely guarded secrets of the war. Their codename referred to the vessels' home port, Queenstown, in Ireland. These became known by the Germans as a U-Boot-Falle ("U-boat trap"). A Q-ship would appear to be an easy target, but in fact carried hidden armaments. A typical Q-ship might resemble a tramp steamer sailing alone in an area where a U-boat was reported to be operating.

Torpedoes are expensive, and a submarine only carries a limited number of them, ideally employed when the vessel is submerged and invisible to her target.  Ammunition for a deck gun, oppositely, is inexpensive and plentiful in comparison.  As a result, submarine captains prefer to surface and use their deck gun on easy or already weakened targets.

By seeming to be a suitable target for the U-boat's deck gun, a Q-ship was intended to lure a submarine into surfacing. Once the U-boat was vulnerable, perhaps even gulled further by pretence of some crew dressed as civilian mariners "abandoning ship" and taking to a boat, the Q-ship would drop its panels and immediately open fire with its deck guns. At the same time, the vessel would reveal her true colours by raising the White Ensign (Royal Navy flag). When successfully fooled a U-boat could quickly be overwhelmed by several guns to its one, or defer from firing and try to submerge before mortally wounded.

The first victory by an unassisted Q-ship came on 24 July 1915 when  sank . The civilian crew of Prince Charles received a cash award. The following month an even smaller converted fishing trawler renamed  successfully destroyed  near Great Yarmouth. Inverlyon was an unpowered sailing ship fitted with a small 3-pounder (47 mm) gun. The British crew fired nine rounds from their 3-pounder into UB-4 at close range, sinking her with the loss of all hands despite the attempt of Inverlyons commander to rescue one surviving German submariner.

On 19 August 1915,  sank , which was preparing to attack the nearby merchant ship Nicosian. About a dozen of the U-boat sailors survived and swam towards the merchant ship. The commanding officer, allegedly fearing that they might scuttle her, ordered the survivors to be shot in the water and sent a boarding party to kill all who had made it aboard. This became known as the "Baralong incident".

 (Q.5) sank  on 22 March 1916. Her commander, Gordon Campbell, was awarded the Victoria Cross (VC). New Zealanders Lieutenant Andrew Dougall Blair and Sub-Lieutenant William Edward Sanders faced three U-boats simultaneously in Helgoland (Q.17) while becalmed and without engines or wireless. Forced to return fire early, they managed to sink one U-boat and avoid two torpedo attacks. Helgoland, while the ship sustained heavy shellfire, waited until the submarine was within , whereupon he hoisted the White Ensign and Prize opened fire. The submarine appeared to sink and he claimed a victory. However, the badly damaged submarine managed to struggle back to port.

According to Warships of World War I by H. M. LeFleming, the Royal Navy converted 58 from merchant ships (18 were sunk by U-boats), in addition to 40  and 20 PC-boats. However Conway's All the World's Fighting Ships 1906–1921 quotes no fewer than 157 named submarine decoy vessels converted from other types of ship, in addition to another ten whose name was unknown. It agrees with LeFleming about the number of sloops and PC-boats.

These ones were completed as Q-ships, disguised as coastal freighters and differed from regular service PC-boats. None were lost in the war. The Flower-class sloops were designed on merchant ship lines thus making them easily adaptable for conversion to Q-ships, 39 being completed as such while the other was converted after being torpedoed. These all had single funnels, and as the merchant ship silhouette was left to the builders. The "Flower-Q's" were employed mainly on convoy and anti-submarine work. Nine were lost during the war. After the war, it was concluded that Q-ships were greatly overrated, diverting skilled seamen from other duties without sinking enough U-boats to justify the strategy. In a total of 150 engagements, British Q-ships destroyed 14 U-boats and damaged 60, at a cost of 27 Q-ships lost out of 200. Q-ships were responsible for about 10% of all U-boats sunk, ranking them well below the use of ordinary minefields in effectiveness.

The Imperial German Navy commissioned six Q-boats during the Great War for the Baltic Sea into the Handelsschutzflottille. None were successful in destroying enemy submarines. The famous Möwe and Wolf were merchant raiders, vessels designed to disrupt enemy trade and sink merchantmen, rather than attack enemy warships.

A surviving example of the Q-ships is HMS Saxifrage, a Flower-class sloop of the Anchusa group completed in 1918. She was renamed  in 1922 and served as the London Division RNR drill ship until 1988, when she was sold privately and remains moored at King's Reach on the Thames.

Second World War

Germany employed at least 13 Q-ships, including the Schürbeck which sank the British submarine . The  German "Dutch" , which sank a number of ships with a total tonnage of 145,960 t including the Norwegian tanker Tirranna on 10 June 1940, was more of a merchant raider.

Nine Q-ships were commissioned by the Royal Navy in September and October 1939 for work in the North Atlantic:

 610-ton HMS Chatsgrove (X85) ex-Royal Navy  PC-74 built 1918
 5,072-ton HMS Maunder (X28) ex-King Gruffyd built 1919
 4,443-ton HMS Prunella (X02) ex-Cape Howe built 1930
 5,119-ton HMS Lambridge (X15) ex-Botlea built 1917
 4,702-ton HMS Edgehill (X39) ex-Willamette Valley built 1928
 5,945-ton HMS Brutus (X96) ex-City of Durban built 1921
 4,398-ton HMS Cyprus (X44) ex-Cape Sable built 1936
 1,030-ton HMS Looe (X63) ex-Beauty built 1924
 1,090-ton HMS Antoine (X72) ex-Orchy built 1930

Prunella and Edgehill were torpedoed and sunk on 21 and 29 June 1940 without even sighting a U-boat. The rest of the vessels were paid off in March 1941 without successfully accomplishing any mission.

The last Royal Navy Q-ship, 2,456-ton , was converted in September, 1940, to carry a torpedo defense net, four  guns, four torpedo tubes, two OS2U Kingfisher floatplanes, and Motor Torpedo Boat 105.

By 12 January 1942, the British Admiralty's intelligence community had noted a "heavy concentration" of U-boats off the "North American seaboard from New York to Cape Race" and passed along this fact to the United States Navy. That day,  under Kapitänleutnant Reinhard Hardegen, torpedoed and sank the British steamship Cyclops, inaugurating Paukenschlag (literally, "a strike on the kettledrum" and sometimes referred to in English as "Operation Drumbeat"). U-boat commanders found peacetime conditions prevailing along the coast: towns and cities were not blacked-out and navigational buoys remained lit; shipping followed normal routines and "carried the normal lights."  Paukenschlag had caught the United States unprepared.

Losses mounted rapidly. On January 20, 1942, Commander-in-Chief, United States Fleet (Cominch), sent a coded dispatch to Commander, Eastern Sea Frontier (CESF), requesting immediate consideration of the manning and fitting-out of "Queen" ships to be operated as an antisubmarine measure.  The result was "Project LQ."

Five vessels were acquired and converted secretly at the Portsmouth Naval Shipyard, Kittery, Maine:

 the Boston beam trawler MS Wave, which briefly became the auxiliary minesweeper USS Eagle (AM-132) before becoming ,
 SS Evelyn and Carolyn, identical cargo vessels that became  and  respectively,
 the tanker SS Gulf Dawn, which became , and
 the schooner Irene Myrtle, which became .

The careers of all five ships were almost entirely unsuccessful and very short, with USS Atik sunk on its first patrol; all Q-ships patrols ended in 1943.

American Q-ships also operated in the Pacific Ocean.  One was  formerly the lumber transport Coos Bay which was converted to Q-ship duty as project "Love William". Anacapa was not successful in engaging any enemy submarines, although she is believed to have damaged two friendly subs with depth charges when they were improperly operating in her vicinity.  Anacapa was also withdrawn from Q-ship duty in 1943 and served out the remainder of World War II as an armed transport in the South Pacific and Aleutian Islands.

The Imperial Japanese Navy converted the 2,205-ton merchant ship, Delhi Maru, into a Q-ship. On 15 January 1944, she departed from Nagaura (now Sodegaura on Tokyo Bay) on her first mission in company with the submarine chaser Ch-50 and the netlayer Tatu Maru. At 22:00 that evening, the vessels were detected by the submarine , which launched three torpedoes. Delhi Maru was hit by all three on her port bow; following a number of internal explosions, she broke in two, the forward section sinking immediately and the aft section sinking later in heavy seas. Although  Swordfish was depth charged by Ch-50, she escaped unscathed.

Proposed use against modern pirates
Attacks on merchant ships by pirates originating on the Somalia coast have brought suggestions from some security experts that Q-ships be used again to tempt pirates into attacking a well-defended ship.

Q-ships in fiction
The Alfred Noyes poem "Kilmeny" is about a Q-ship, a British trawler equipped with two deck guns, that destroys a German submarine during World War I.

In Ernest Hemingway's novel Islands in the Stream, the main character Thomas Hudson commands a Q-ship for the US Navy around Cuba as he hunts the survivors of a sunken German U-boat.

In Edward L. Beech’s novel Run Silent, Run Deep, Japanese Q-ships make two appearances with one surprising the Walrus and the second being attacked by the Eel in the final battle of the story.

Malcolm Lowry's novel Under the Volcano (1947) tells the story of Geoffrey Firmin, an alcoholic British consul in the small Mexican town of Quauhnahuac, on the Day of the Dead, 2 November 1938. Geoffrey Firmin reflects back to his time as a naval officer during World War I, when he was court-martialed and subsequently decorated for his actions aboard a Q-ship (the captured German officers disappeared and were allegedly burned alive in the boiler).

In the Clive Cussler book series Oregon Files, the main base of operations is a Q-ship, a converted lumber carrier. The crew are mercenaries and former US covert and military personnel who carry out missions around the world in support of US policy while earning their living performing mercenary operations.

The 1951 movie Operation Pacific features a battle with a Q-Ship by the fictional submarine USS Thunderfish, inspired by an encounter with an enemy ship by the USS Growler.

As with other naval concepts, the idea of a Q-ship has also been applied to space vessels in fictional works:

Q-ships feature prominently in David Weber's Honor Harrington series of books. Harrington destroys a Q-ship in the first novel, On Basilisk Station, and commands a squadron of Q-ships in the sixth novel, Honor Among Enemies. In the tenth book in the series, War of Honor, Thomas Bachfisch commands a pair of privately owned Q-ships.

In the Jan/Feb 2020 issue of Analog Science Fiction and Fact, Joel Richards has a short story titled "Q-ship Militant".

In DC Comics Star Spangled War Stories #71 (reprinted in DC Comics Weird War #1) the story "The End of the Sea Wolf!" is a postwar "flashback" story of a U-boat commander engaging a Q-ship in WWII.

A fictional WWII Royal Navy Q-ship named 'HMS Mendacious' features in the 'Unclassified Encounter' Youtube Channel Episode 'Mendacious'. During the course of the episode, the ship and its crew are drawn into battle with Atlantean warriors, whilst on patrol in the North Sea.

See also
 Harold Auten of Q-ship HMS Stock Force awarded VC
 Merchant raiders
 Commerce raiding
 Tonnage war
 Hague Conventions of 1899 and 1907
 East Indiaman
 Armed merchantmen
 CAM ship
 Merchant aircraft carrier
 Mary B Mitchell (Q-ship)

References

Bibliography

External links

 Royal Navy 'Q' Ships
 British Special Service or Q-Ships
 Q-23
 Für Kaiser und Reich, His Imperial German Majesty's U-Boats in the First World War
  "Q-Boats – An Answer to Submarines", Popular Science, January 1940
 

Anti-submarine weapons
Q-ships
Ship types
Military use of mimicry